Tarap is a village and Union Council situated on the bank of river Sawan in the Attock District of Punjab province in Pakistan. It is administered by Jand Tehsil and Attock District. Previously, it was administered by Tehsil Talagang and District Campbellpur, now Attock.  It is situated on the river bank of River Sawan, emerging from the Potohar Region and Nullah Lai of Rawalpindi.  There is one high school for boys and also for girls.  A basic health unit is also situated. Tarap union council is biggest union council of Tehsil Jand but far from Jand and District Complex Attock, Tarap union council have 4 villages and 10 sub villages with 20000 population. Actually Tarap Town is very nearby Tehsil Talagang only 45 km distance and Tarap distance from Tehsil Complex Jand is 60 km and 150 km from District Complex Attock. Actually Tarap Town is administratively attached with District Attock due to political benefit of local politician otherwise for middle class and poor peoples the administratively attachment with Tehsil Complex Talagang is most fruitful useful and economical in education courts and business matters for middle class community.

External links
 Apna Tarap village website

Villages in Attock District